SolanoExpress is a public transit network of regional express buses connecting Solano County, California to Contra Costa County (across the Carquinez Strait) and the Sacramento Valley. It is managed by the Solano Transportation Authority and operated by SolTrans. The Solano Transportation Authority is a joint powers authority established in 1990 by Solano County and the cities of Benicia, Dixon, Fairfield, Rio Vista, Suisun City, Vacaville, and Vallejo to serve as the Congestion Management Agency for Solano County, as mandated by California law.

Routes 
SolanoExpress consists of four routes, centered on Solano County, and extending both south to the inner Bay Area and northeast to Sacramento. It makes connections at a number of regional transit hubs, including Walnut Creek BART, El Cerrito del Norte BART, Vallejo Transit Center, Fairfield Transportation Center, Suisun-Fairfield station, Vacaville Transportation Center, Dixon Park & Ride, and Sacramento Valley Station.

All routes are operated by SolTrans. Prior to 2022, the Green and Blue Lines were operated by Fairfield and Suisun Transit (FAST). The Green Line transitioned from FAST to SolTrans in April 2022, and the Blue Line followed in August 2022.

Fares 
Single-ride fares within Solano County are $2.75 for adults, $2.00 for youth, and $1.35 for seniors and the disabled. Single-ride intercounty fares are $5.00 for adults, $4.00 for youth, and $2.50 for seniors and the disabled. Clipper cards are accepted on all routes. Intracounty and intercounty day passes are available.

See also
 All Nighter — a regional consortium that provides a late-night bus network
 Dumbarton Express — a similar consortium providing service across the Dumbarton Bridge

References

Bus transportation in California
Public transportation in Contra Costa County, California
Public transportation in Napa County, California
Public transportation in Sacramento County, California
Public transportation in San Francisco
Public transportation in San Joaquin County, California
Public transportation in Solano County, California